The National Commission on Culture is a Government of Ghana agency responsible for cultural matters. It is under the Ministry of Tourism, Culture and Creative Arts.

References

Cultural organisations based in Ghana
Ministries and Agencies of State of Ghana
Ministry for Chieftaincy and Religious Affairs